St Aidan's Church of England High School is a mixed Church of England secondary school and sixth form with academy status, located in Harrogate, North Yorkshire, England. It currently houses over 2500 students of both lower school and sixth form age. 

The school was labelled as "outstanding" by an Ofsted report in October 2006. It is ranked 475th in the country for its GCSE results in 2006 by The Times.
In 2022, after an inspection in September 2021, Ofsted reported St Aidan's to be "inadequate", marking a fall from the highest to the lowest Ofsted Grades. The rating was due to the "inadequate" Senior Leadership and Safeguarding at the school and the report states pupils were being "put at risk". However, after another Ofsted inspection carried out in May 2022, the school's rating was raised to "good".

History
The former Bishop of Ripon, the Right Reverend John Moorman, laid its foundation stone on 18 June 1966. It opened in September 1966 to provide Church of England education for Harrogate's fast-growing population. Since then, it has grown in pupil numbers.

Building work
The school building has grown. The most notable addition to the site is perhaps the Constance Green Hall. It was built adjacent to the ancient Bede House (formerly Wheatlands Academy), a building converted for the school's use and opened in 1997. More recently, a fully refurbished Learning resources centre, with approximately 15,000 resources and 42 computer workstations opened in May 2006 with a "Beatles Night", featuring the tribute group the Plastic Beatles, Ned and His Angry Stoats, Mexican fire-eaters and a Cilla Black tribute act.

Other building work included completely refurbishing the Sixth Form Café area and the old chapel and replacing the bottom tennis courts near the music block with classrooms and a new chapel. The barn was replaced by new tennis courts. There were plans for Eton Fives courts and a Koi pond, but these were never realised. In September 2007, the lecture theatre was replaced by a Dance studio for pupils studying Dance.

In 2022, a large portion of the grass field was replaced by a new Astroturf pitch.

Awards
The school was made one of the first Beacon Schools in 1998. It was also awarded Specialist College Science Status. It won the International Schools Award from the British Council in 2006.
The school also received specialist Languages College Status, and followed this up with a series of Languages Days for both students of both primary and secondary level.

Music
There are many ensembles run by staff and students with the senior ensembles competing in national competitions.  

Founded in 1992 by former Director of Music at the school, Cathy Roberts, St Aidan's Chamber Choir is made up of members of the St Aidan's and St John Fisher Associated Sixth Form. It has appeared in the BBC Songs of Praise School Choirs Competition several times, winning in 2006. Recently the Choir celebrated its 30th anniversary with a concert in Ripon Cathedral. 

The school is home to a Symphony Orchestra, Symphonic Wind Band and Swing Band among others. In 2009 the Symphonic Wind Band gained a Silver Award in the National Concert Band Championships held in Cardiff.

Sport 
Jonathan Webb was a pupil at this school between 2001–2008 and an integral part of the football team's success in the North Yorkshire School Football circuit and at National level. He now plays for Loughborough University FC after a brief professional career at Leeds United and Newcastle Blue Star.

Caroline Lambert, a pupil between 2003 and 2010 is a regular member of England Great Britain fell running teams and World u23 mountain running trophy winner.

Lucy Buxton (2004–2011) is an England junior basketball player.

George Mills (2010–present) is the current English Schools' 800m champion and England representative at the junior commonwealth games.

Sixth form

The school forms part of an associated sixth form with St John Fisher Catholic High School.

Notable faculty
Dennis Richards, headteacher 1988–2011,  was awarded an OBE in 2007 for services to education. He also won the Ted Wragg Award for Lifetime Achievement at the 2007 Teaching Awards.

On 31 December 2011 it was announced that the former deputy head of St Aidan's, Steve Hatcher, had been awarded an MBE for services to education in the Queen's New Year's Honours list.

In January 2018, a third member of staff, Timothy Staden Pocock, was awarded an MBE for services to education, charity and local football.

Notable alumni
 Maisie Adam (comedian)
 Jacob Dudman (actor)
 Malcolm Neesam (historian, who attended Christ Church Secondary School for Boys which was amalgamated with St Aidan's).

References

External links

St. Aidan's School Website
BBC Press Release for Songs of Praise
St. Aidan's Examination Results 2006
October 2006 Ofsted Report
School Prospectus 2006/07

Schools in Harrogate
Church of England secondary schools in the Diocese of Leeds
Educational institutions established in 1966
1966 establishments in England
Secondary schools in North Yorkshire
Academies in North Yorkshire